"Love's Old Sweet Song" is a Victorian parlour song published in 1884 by composer James Lynam Molloy and lyricist Graham Clifton Bingham. The first line of the chorus is "Just a song at twilight", and its title is sometimes misidentified as such. Bingham wrote the lyric of ‘Love’s Old Sweet Song’, after which various composers competed to set it to music. The successful candidate was James Molloy.

It was first sung by Antoinette Sterling at a concert at St. James Hall in London in 1884. James Molloy worked at her house on the melody and accompaniment.
The song has been recorded by many artists, including John McCormack and Clara Butt. The song is alluded to in James Joyce's Ulysses as being sung by Molly Bloom.

Arthur Sullivan was accused of using the song’s first two bars for ‘When a merry maiden marries’ in The Gondoliers; he denied it.

Notable recordings
1892 Thomas Bott
1905 Corrine Morgan
1920 Chester Gaylord
1932 Rondoliers and Piano Pals
1940 The Mills Brothers - recorded March 22, 1940 for Decca Records (catalog No. 3455B).
1950 Jo Stafford and Gordon MacRae
1954 Bing Crosby recorded the song in 1956 for use on his radio show and it was subsequently included in a CD On the Sentimental Side issued by Collectors' Choice Music (catalog CCM2106) in 2010. Crosby also included the song in a medley on his album 101 Gang Songs (1961)
1960 Ruby Murray - included in her album Ruby.
2011 Celtic Thunder Paul Byrom and Damian Mcginty

Film appearances
1923 Love's Old Sweet Song (1923 film) a two-reel short film made in the DeForest Phonofilm sound-on-film process.
1926 The Sea Beast - as the theme in the orchestral score in John Barrymore's film.
1931 Hell Divers - played on piano by Wallace Beery
1934 Judge Priest - sung offscreen by an unidentified voice. Played also in the score.
1935 The Arizonian - played in a show and danced to by Margot Grahame with James Bush and Richard Dix.
1936 Sabotage - sung a cappella by a man lighting candles
1938 Storm Over Bengal
1939 Broadway Serenade - played on piano by Lew Ayres and sung by Jeanette MacDonald and audience in the Naughty Nineties nightclub.
1940 Rebecca - hummed by Joan Fontaine
1941 The Farmer's Wife - sung by Patricia Roc
1942 Unseen Enemy - sung by Irene Hervey
1943 It Comes Up Love
1946 Demobbed - sung by Anne Ziegler and Webster Booth in the garden medley
1947 Life with Father - played on piano and sung by William Powell
1950 Cheaper by the Dozen - played by the children on various instruments
1950 Father Is a Bachelor
1952 Wait till the Sun Shines, Nellie
1952 Belles on Their Toes - sung by Myrna Loy, Jeanne Crain, Debra Paget, Barbara Bates, Robert Arthur and Hoagy Carmichael right after the beach barbecue
1965 The Intelligence Men
1975 The Wind and the Lion
1990 Awakenings
1992 Enchanted April

In popular culture
The song is mentioned in the chorus of Moonlight Bay, a popular song written in 1912.

A surreal rendition of the song was performed by comedian Spike Milligan in his series Q5.

A comical abbreviated rendition of the song is performed by Miss Cathcart (Mary Wickes) in the Dennis the Menace TV show episode "Grandpa and Miss Cathcart", first aired on October 25, 1959.

The track A losing battle is raging, from The Caretaker's 2017 album Everywhere at the end of time (Stage 2), features an instrumental sample of Chester Gaylord’s rendition of the song taken from either an Edison Diamond Disc or cylinder record, looped and manipulated in a deliberately disorientating fashion to reflect the fictional protagonist's steadily worsening dementia.

In The Wolvercote Tongue, an episode of Inspector Morse, Morse quotes, or perhaps misquotes, from the song, and mentions its title.

In the Little House on the Prairie series' eighth book, These Happy Golden Years, Pa sings the song to Laura on the night before she is to be married.

In the film Very Annie Mary 2001, the song is sung by Jack Pugh (Jonathan Pryce) at the piano, accompanied by the Mayor of Ogw, South Wales (Radcliffe Grafton) in an early scene, accompanying scenes of Annie Mary running to the local chip shop after having cooked a disastrous meal for her father.

In the first act of Arthur Miller's "All My Sons," written in 1947, the character of Ann references the lyric "dear dead days beyond recall" when returning to visit her childhood home.

In the 1947 film “Life with Father” William Powell can be seen playing a few bars and singing a portion of the chorus.

References

External links
 Love’s Old Sweet Song lyrics

1884 songs
Irish folk songs